Canebreak Branch is a  long 1st order tributary to Lanes Creek in Anson County, North Carolina.  This is the only stream of this name in the United States.

Course
Canebreak Branch rises about 0.5 miles southwest of Kikers, North Carolina.  Canebreak Branch then flows southeast to meet Lanes about 2 miles north of Griffins Crossroads.

Watershed
Canebreak Branch drains  of area, receives about 48.0 in/year of precipitation, has a topographic wetness index of 390.95 and is about 60% forested.

References

Rivers of North Carolina
Rivers of Anson County, North Carolina
Tributaries of the Pee Dee River